Reyko (stylized "REYKO") are a Spanish musical duo based in London, consisting of vocalist Soleil and producer and multi instrumentalist Igor.

History
The two members of Reyko, Soleil and Igor, are from Spain but are currently based in London. Before forming the duo, Soleil worked as an osteopath, and Igor was a professional tennis player before deciding to pursue a music career. They started writing music together as part of Igor's music production course at the University of West London.  Soon after, they began regularly posting songs on the Soundcloud platform. 

They encountered success quite early when one their songs "Spinning Over You", was chosen to be the official song for a major 2018 ad campaign by El Corte Ingles. The song became a radio hit in Spain, peaking at #13 nationally. In 2018, Reyko were nominated for best new artist in LOS40 Music Awards.

In mid 2019, the duo broke ties with their then label Mushroom Pillow after they found out the label was licensing their unreleased music without their knowledge. The dispute lasted a year, during which the band was prevented from releasing any music and making any live performances.

In April 2019, Reyko contributed a version of "El Cine" to a Warner Music tribute album consisting of covers to Mecano's album Descanso Dominical.

Between August 2019 and January 2020, the duo released a series of singles: "Lose Myself", followed by "Hierba Mala", "Don't Mention My Name", "Surrender" and "La Verdad". In March 2020, the duo released their self-titled debut album, which includes their previously released singles. It has been described as “a beautiful mixture of genres and influences. The album seamlessly fuses traditional Spanish influences with new age millennial futuristic sounds. Lead singer Soleil’s ability to switch from Spanish to English is masterful Igor’s creative production provides the perfect canvas for Soleil’s soft angelic voice.”

In spring 2020 the duo had to postpone the album presentation tour due to the COVID-19 pandemic

In the beginning of '21, Reyko released a cover of EMF's classic song “Unbelievable”. The cover has been featured in one of the trailers of the Freeform (TV channel) Cruel Summer (TV series). 

From September'20 the duo has released the singles “The Game”, “Saturday” and “She Said” as an advance of their forthcoming album.  Reyko's 2nd album “Pulse” was released in October 2021 to positive reviews. "Pulse" showcased Soleil's and Igor's more urgent, immediate  and driving musical direction, borrowing from post-punk and electro-clash. Talking about the album, Malvika Pavin from Earmilk wrote: “Designed with a vibe meant to be “urgent, direct, and immediate,” the album sees the pair swerve away from the dreamy stylings of their debut album, with an innovative a nd eccentric blend of genres of their latest foray.”

Musical Style 
The duo define themselves as “DIY” since they independently write, produce, and record everything they release from their home studio based in London. They cite Billie Holiday, Lana Del Rey, Weeknd, Lorde, Portishead, and Manu Chao as influences. Their music has been described as alt-pop.

In Media 
Reyko's songs have been included in various soundtracks:

 "Spinning Over You" was the official song for El Corte Ingles 2018 winter sales campaign. The song is also included in the Netflix series Elite soundtrack, episode 4 season 2.
 ”Hierba Mala” is included in the Netflix series "House Of Flowers" soundtrack, episode 6, season 1.
 "Set You Free" is the theme song for the Netflix series Toy Boy.
 Your Game” appears on the closing scene of the last episode of the Netflix series Toy Boy . The duo was asked to write the song specifically for the scene.

Discography

Studio albums 
 REYKO (2020)
 Pulse (2021)

EPs
Midnight Sunshine (2018)

References

External links
Official website

Electropop groups